The 1969 San Diego State Aztecs football team was an American football team that represented San Diego State College during the 1969 NCAA University Division football season.

This was San Diego State's first year in the University Division and was the inaugural season for the Pacific Coast Athletic Association (PCAA). The team was led by head coach Don Coryell, in his ninth year, and played home games at San Diego Stadium in San Diego, California.

They finished the season as conference champion and had a Pasadena Bowl victory over Boston University, 28–7. This third undefeated season under Coryell ended with a record of eleven wins, zero losses (11–0, 6–0 PCAA). The Aztecs were ranked eighteenth in the final UPI Poll.

The team's statistical leaders included Dennis Shaw with 3,185 passing yards, George Brown with 558 rushing yards, and Tim Delaney with 1,259 receiving yards.

Schedule

Team players in the NFL
The following San Diego State players were selected in the 1970 NFL Draft.

The following finished their college career in 1969, were not drafted, but played in the NFL.

Team awards

Notes

References

San Diego State
San Diego State Aztecs football seasons
Big West Conference football champion seasons
College football undefeated seasons
San Diego State Aztecs football